Hyde Street is an iconic street in San Francisco, California. Hyde Street connects the Aquatic Park Historic District to Market Street. A portion of the  street is served by the Powell–Hyde line of the San Francisco cable car system, and the northern terminal of that line is on Hyde Street. The street also became famous for Rice-A-Roni commercials; almost every commercial ends with a cable car on the street.

As of 2018, 300 block of the street in Tenderloin is unsanitary due to a high concentration of homeless drug addicts.

References

External links

Russian Hill, San Francisco
Shopping districts and streets in the United States
Streets in San Francisco